Francisco Leonardo (born 12 April 1996) is an Argentine professional footballer who plays as a forward for Torneo Federal A side Club Círculo Deportivo.

Career
Leonardo began with Aldosivi of the Argentine Primera División in 2016, making two appearances in the first half of the 2016–17 season; coming on as a substitute in games against Tigre and Patronato respectively. He made one more appearance in the season that ended with relegation to Primera B Nacional.

Career statistics
.

Honours
Aldosivi
Primera B Nacional: 2017–18

References

External links

1996 births
Living people
Sportspeople from Mar del Plata
Argentine footballers
Association football forwards
Argentine Primera División players
Primera Nacional players
Torneo Federal A players
Aldosivi footballers